Elena Tchalykh (born 25 March 1974) is a Russian professional racing cyclist who competed from 2011 on for Azerbaijan. She competed at the 2012 Summer Olympics in the Women's road race and in the Women's time trial.

Career highlights

1990
1st Pursuit, Track World Championships (Junior)
3rd Points race, Track World Championships (Junior)

1992
2nd Pursuit, Track World Championships (Junior)

2000
3rd Pursuit, Track World Championships

2001
1st  Russian National Road Race Championships
3rd Pursuit, Track World Championships

2003
2nd Omnium, European Track Championships

2004
3rd Pursuit, Track World Championships
3rd Pursuit, Round 2, 2004–2005 Track World Cup, Los Angeles

2008
2nd Team Pursuit, Round 3, 2007–2008 Track World Cup, Los Angeles
3rd Scratch, Round 3, 2007–2008 Track World Cup, Los Angeles
1st  omnium, 2008 European Track Championships
1st  Russian National Time Trial Championships

2009
3rd Team Pursuit, Round 4, 2008–2009 Track World Cup, Beijing

External links
 

1974 births
Living people
People from Rubtsovsk
Russian female cyclists
Azerbaijani female cyclists
Russian track cyclists
Cyclists at the 2004 Summer Olympics
Olympic cyclists of Russia
Cyclists at the 2012 Summer Olympics
Olympic cyclists of Azerbaijan
Sportspeople from Altai Krai